Henry Jepson Latham (December 10, 1908 – June 26, 2002) was an American attorney, politician, and jurist from New York.

Early life and education
He was born on December 10, 1908, in Brooklyn. He graduated from Richmond Hill High School and completed a law degree at St. John's College in 1931. He practiced law in New York City, and later received an LL.M. from Brooklyn Law School.

Career 
A Republican, he was a member of the New York State Assembly (Queens Co., 4th D.) in 1941 and 1942. In 1942 Latham joined the United States Navy, became a pilot, and served in the Pacific Theater until February, 1945, afterwards serving as a member of the United States Navy Reserve.

In 1944 he ran for the U.S. House in absentia and won. He was reelected six times, and served in the 79th, 80th, 81st, 82nd, 83rd, 84th and 85th United States Congresses. He held office from January 3, 1945, to December 31, 1958, when he resigned to go on the bench. Latham voted in favor of the Civil Rights Act of 1957.

A conservative with a strong anti-communist stance, Latham served on the United States House Committee on Rules, and advocated increasing the size and capability of the United States Armed Forces. He also favored providing arms to Taiwan, then known as Formosa, so it could fight the Communist government of China.

Latham was a justice of the New York Supreme Court from 1959 to 1978.

Death 
He died on June 26, 2002, in Southold, New York and was buried at Saint Patricks Cemetery in Southold.

References

 New York Times, Obituary, Henry J. Latham, 93, Queens Congressman, June 26, 2002
 Henry J. Latham at The Political Graveyard

1908 births
2002 deaths
Republican Party members of the New York State Assembly
St. John's University School of Law alumni
Brooklyn Law School alumni
New York Supreme Court Justices
United States Navy officers
United States Navy personnel of World War II
United States Navy reservists
Republican Party members of the United States House of Representatives from New York (state)
20th-century American politicians
20th-century American judges